Sian Emma O'Callaghan (3 June 1988 –  March 2011) was a 22-year-old British woman who disappeared from Swindon, Wiltshire, England, having last been seen at a nightclub in the town in the early hours of 19 March 2011. Her body was found on 24 March near Uffington in Oxfordshire. On 19 October 2012, at Bristol Crown Court, Christopher Halliwell, 48, of Nythe, Swindon pleaded guilty to O'Callaghan's murder.

Timeline 

At 02:52 on 19 March 2011, O'Callaghan was captured on CCTV leaving Swindon's Suju nightclub to walk  to the flat in Swindon's Old Town area that she shared with her boyfriend, Kevin Reape. At 09:45, Reape contacted the police and reported O'Callaghan as missing.

On 20 March, the police issued their first public appeal for information, and announced that they had begun searching Savernake Forest. They stated that the time that elapsed between O'Callaghan's appearance on the club's CCTV and her mobile phone signal (02:52 and 03:24 respectively) meant that the journey from Swindon to the forest could only have been made in a vehicle. On 22 March, approximately 400 members of the public joined the police in their search of the forest. The same day, an anonymous donor offered a £20,000 reward for information that would lead to finding O'Callaghan.

On 23 March, police announced that analysis of O'Callaghan's mobile phone signals led to the identification of a number of "hot spots" to be investigated. Detective Superintendent Stephen Fulcher of Wiltshire Police said that the investigation was moving at a "rapid pace", and that "significant lines of inquiry" were being developed. Members of the public were asked to stand down from searches. On 24 March, police made an urgent appeal for witnesses of a green Toyota Avensis with taxi markings, which had been seen between Swindon and Savernake Forest shortly after O'Callaghan's disappearance.

Arrest and discovery of body 

On the afternoon of 24 March, police arrested a 47-year-old taxicab driver, Christopher Halliwell, from Swindon on suspicion of kidnapping. The arrest was made at an Asda supermarket in north Swindon, where a green Toyota Avensis taxi was also seized. Later the same day, O'Callaghan's body was found in a shallow grave near Uffington, Oxfordshire.

On 26 March the suspect was charged with O'Callaghan's murder. During a news conference on 26 March, Fulcher stated that tests revealed O'Callaghan had not been sexually assaulted. On 1 April, the inquest at Oxford coroner's court was told that it was likely O'Callaghan died from head injuries, though a forensic pathologist from the Home Office had yet to confirm a precise cause of death. O'Callaghan's funeral was held at Kingsdown Crematorium on 18 April 2011.

Trial and subsequent events 
On 31 May 2012, taxi driver Christopher Halliwell appeared in court at a plea and case management hearing, and pleaded not guilty to the charge of murdering Sian O'Callaghan. On 19 October 2012, he appeared at Bristol Crown Court and pleaded guilty to her murder. He was sentenced to life imprisonment with a minimum tariff of 25 years. The Court of Appeal upheld the sentence on 14 December 2012.

Becky Godden-Edwards murder 
Following the guilty plea, it emerged that a second murder charge against Halliwell had been dropped as a result of an error in the police handling of the case. The body of Becky Godden-Edwards, 20, a woman who had been reported missing in 2007, was found after Halliwell's arrest; he had led police to the body. Justice Laura Cox ruled that Halliwell's confessions to killing each of the women were inadmissible as evidence, as Detective Superintendent Stephen Fulcher had breached the guidelines of the Police and Criminal Evidence Act 1984 by failing to caution Halliwell and denying him access to a solicitor during the period that the confessions were obtained.

On 23 April 2013, an inquest at Oxford Coroner's Court into the death of Godden-Edwards recorded a narrative verdict stating that the cause of her death, believed to have been in the final days of 2002 or early in 2003, was "unascertained but probably caused unlawfully by a third party". In September 2013, the Independent Police Complaints Commission published the result of an investigation, which found that Fulcher had a case to answer for gross misconduct for breaches of the Police and Criminal Evidence Act and for ignoring force orders. In January 2014, he was found guilty of gross misconduct and given a final written warning by a disciplinary tribunal. In May 2014, Fulcher resigned from Wiltshire Police. Karen Edwards, the mother of Becky Godden-Edwards, commented: "Had he have followed the guidelines, then Becky would never have been found, she would have never have come into the equation."

On 31 March 2016, Christopher Halliwell was charged with the murder of Godden-Edwards before magistrates in Chippenham, Wiltshire. On 19 September 2016, a jury at Bristol Crown Court found him guilty of the murder after two hours of deliberation. On 23 September, Justice John Griffith Williams sentenced Halliwell to life imprisonment with a whole life order for the murder, meaning he would serve his sentence without the possibility of parole.

On 2 September 2019, ITV broadcast the first episode of A Confession, a six-part drama series based on the case, with Martin Freeman playing Detective Superintendent Fulcher and Joe Absolom playing Halliwell. In September 2022, an investigation by the Independent Office for Police Conduct found that Wiltshire Police had missed significant opportunities between 2011 and 2014 to bring Halliwell to justice sooner for the murder.

Alleged links to other cases

In lead detective Stephen Fulcher's 2017 book on the O'Callaghan and Godden-Edwards cases, he wrote that after apprehending Halliwell he had ordered the re-opening of the investigation into the unsolved 1995 disappearance of prostitute Sally Ann John, believing he may have murdered her. She was last seen alive on Aylesbury Street in Swindon at 10:45pm on Friday 8 September 1995, at an area near the town's red-light district. She was planning to look for clients that night until about midnight. Links were made to Halliwell as both he and the 23-year-old sex worker had lived on Broad Street, Swindon, and Halliwell was known to have been a client of hers. However, soon after Fulcher left the force Wiltshire Police closed the investigation again. 

The case was subsequently opened again in November 2014, this time as a murder inquiry, after the discovery of "significant new information" – although it was stated at this stage that the inquiry was not being linked to a new investigation at Halliwell's former home. In 2015, police searched Sally Ann John's last-known address in Kimmeridge Close in Swindon, and days later arrested three men, aged 52, 50 and 52 respectively, on suspicion of her kidnap and murder. They were subsequently released on bail pending further enquiries. In February 2017, two new searches were made at properties on Broad Street where Halliwell and John both lived.

In March 2017, the Sally Ann John case featured on the BBC TV programme Crimewatch. Detectives stated that they had liaised with the investigators on the Halliwell case but they were keeping an "open mind" on press reports claiming he may have been involved. John's mother revealed that her daughter had started to get involved with the "wrong people" in her late teens, and continued to associate with them despite warnings that they were bad characters, although shortly before she disappeared she had planned to try and get away from the life of sex work. After she vanished, her house had been searched but nothing was missing or abnormal. Most importantly, on the programme it was revealed that several postcards sent weeks after John's disappearance to a friend had been found to have been forged. One was sent from London three weeks after she vanished, claiming she was safe and well. The handwriting was conclusively found to have not been John's handwriting, showing that an unidentified person had purposely forged a message from her.

In 2020, Merseyside Police opened an investigation into the unsolved murder of Julie Finley in 1994, after reports of a possible link to Halliwell. By December 2022, no charges had been made.

In 2023, a Channel 4 documentary, In the Footsteps of Killers, suggested a link between Halliwell and the Disappearance of Trevaline Evans, though this was unproven. Though there were some similarities in the modus operandi in that case, Mrs Evans was aged 52 and disappeared from North Wales.

See also
Chris Clark, crime writer who in a 2021 book The New Millennium Serial Killer claimed Halliwell could be linked to more murders
Murder of Elizabeth McCabe, unsolved murder of a Dundee woman in 1980 that occurred in similar circumstances
List of kidnappings
List of solved missing person cases
List of prisoners with whole-life orders
Murder of Lindsay Rimer, an unsolved murder that has previously been linked to Halliwell
Brewer v. Williams, U.S. Supreme Court case arising from similar circumstances

References

External links
Sian O'Callaghan murder: how taxi driver's confession was secured Steven Morris, The Guardian, 9 September 2013.

2011 murders in the United Kingdom
2011 in England
Crime in Oxfordshire
Crime in Wiltshire
Date of death unknown
Deaths by person in England
Female murder victims
Formerly missing people
Kidnapped British people
Kidnappings in the United Kingdom
March 2011 crimes
March 2011 events in the United Kingdom
Murder in England
Violence against women in England